Mallacoota Airport  is located at Mallacoota, Victoria, Australia and is operated by East Gippsland Shire Council.

See also
 List of airports in Victoria

References

Airports in Victoria (Australia)
East Gippsland